The men's pole vault at the 1934 European Athletics Championships was held in Turin, Italy, at the  Stadio Benito Mussolini on 7 September 1934.

Medalists

Results

Final
7 September

Qualification
7 September

Participation
According to an unofficial count, 11 athletes from 9 countries participated in the event.

 (1)
 (1)
 (1)
 (2)
 (1)
 (1)
 (1)
 (2)
 (1)

References

Pole vault
Pole vault at the European Athletics Championships